Eirik Skjælaaen (born 14 October 1974) is a retired Norwegian football midfielder.

A youth player in Bergen Nord FK, he was among others offered a scholarship from a university in Colorado. He represented Norway as a youth international. In 1992 he joined the largest club in Bergen, SK Brann. He appeared for the first team from 1995 on, and following a 1995 season with ample playing opportunities he featured more scarcely in 1996 and 1997 and not at all in 1998.

In late July 1998 a quintet was axed from the Brann squad, being demoted to the junior team lest they found another club: Geir Hasund, Eirik Skjælaaen, Gunnar Norebø, Morten Pettersen and André Herfindal. A week later Skjælaaen signed for FK Haugesund on loan. After a lengthy contract dispute also involving the players' trade union, Skjælaaen was finally released in April 1999 and commenced a long stint in Fyllingen.

References

1974 births
Living people
Footballers from Bergen
Norwegian footballers
SK Brann players
FK Haugesund players
Fyllingen Fotball players
Eliteserien players
Association football midfielders
Norway youth international footballers